Princess Isabelle of Salm-Salm, full German name: Isabelle Maria Rosa Katherina Antonia, Prinzessin zu Salm und Salm-Salm (13 February 1903, Potsdam, Kingdom of Prussia, Germany – 10 January 2009, Kevelaer, North Rhine-Westphalia, Germany) was a member of the House of Salm and a Princess of Salm-Salm by birth. Through her marriage to Felix, Baron von Loë, Isabelle was also Baroness von Loë.

Early life
Isabelle was the eldest child and daughter of Emanuel, Hereditary Prince of Salm-Salm (1871–1916) and his wife Archduchess Maria Christina of Austria.

Marriage and issue
Isabelle married Felix, Baron von Loë (1896–1944), son of Friedrich Leopold, Baron von Loë (1861–1899) and his wife Countess Paula von Korff-Schmising (1863–1942), on 8 September 1925 in Anholt. Isabelle and Felix had seven children:

Friedrich, Baron of Loë (born 8 June 1926) married Inez, Baroness von Boeselager
Christine, Baroness von Loë (born 31 Jul 1927) married Prince Johannes of Löwenstein-Wertheim-Rosenberg
Wessel, Baron von Loë (born 8 August 1928) married Countess Sophie von Waldburg-Zeil-Hohenems
Elisabeth, Baroness von Loë (born 15 March 1930) married Baron Philipp Wambolt von Umstadt
Paula, Baroness von Loë (1 March 1931 – 29 October 1950)
Franz, Baron von Loë (born 24 October 1936) married Countess Josepha von Magnis
Maria Rosa, Baroness von Loë (born 3 June 1939) has a son

Isabelle lived to nearly 106 and was one of the longest-lived members of any princely family.

Ancestry

References

1903 births
2009 deaths
People from Potsdam
Salm-Salm
German centenarians
Women centenarians